CDIO are trademarked initiali for Conceive Design Implement Operate. The CDIO Initiative is an educational framework that stresses engineering fundamentals set in the context of conceiving, designing, implementing and operating real-world systems and products. Throughout the world, CDIO Initiative collaborators have adopted CDIO as the framework of their curricular planning and outcome-based assessment. The CDIO approach uses active learning tools, such as group projects and problem-based learning, to better equip engineering students with technical knowledge as well as communication and professional skills. Additionally, the CDIO Initiative provides resources for instructors of member universities to improve their teaching abilities.

Concept
The CDIO concept was originally conceived at the Massachusetts Institute of Technology in the late 1990s. In 2000, MIT in collaboration with three Swedish universities — Chalmers University of Technology, Linköping University and the Royal Institute of Technology — formally founded the CDIO Initiative. It became an international collaboration, with universities around the world adopting the same framework.

CDIO collaborators recognize that an engineering education is acquired over a long period and in a variety of institutions, and that educators in all parts of this spectrum can learn from practice elsewhere. The CDIO network therefore welcomes members in a diverse range of institutions ranging from research-led internationally acclaimed universities to local colleges dedicated to providing students with their initial grounding in engineering.

The collaborators maintain a dialogue about what works and what does not and continue to refine the project. Determining additional members of the collaboration is a selective process managed by a Council comprising original members and early adopters.

The CDIO revised syllabus consists of four parts: 
 Disciplinary knowledge and reasoning
 Personal and professional skills and attributes
 Interpersonal skills: teamwork and communication
 Conceiving, designing, implementing, and operating systems in the enterprise, societal, and environmental context

Members
The following institutions collaborate in the CDIO initiative:

Australia
Chisholm Institute, Centre for Integrated Engineering & Science
Curtin University
Queensland University of Technology
RMIT University
University of Sydney
University of the Sunshine Coast

Brasil
Centro Universitário Salesiano de São Paulo (UNISAL)
Instituto Militar de Engenharia
Universidade Federal de Santa Maria
Centro Universitário do Estado do Pará - CESUPA

Belgium
Hogeschool Gent
Group T - International University College Leuven

Canada
École Polytechnique de Montréal
Queen's University, Ontario
Sheridan College
University of Calgary
University of Manitoba

Chile
Catholic University of the Holy Conception
University of Chile
University of Los Lagos
University of Santiago, Chile

China
Beijing Institute of Petrochemical Technology
Beijing Jiaotong University
Chengdu University of Information Technology
Shantou University
Suzhou Industrial Park Institute of Vocational Technology
Tsinghua University
University of Electronic Science and Technology of China
Yanshan University

Colombia
ICESI University
National University of Colombia
Pontifical Xavierian University
University of Antioquia
University of Santo Tomas
University of Quindío

Denmark
Aalborg University
Aarhus University
Technical University of Denmark

Finland
Lahti University of Applied Sciences
Lapland University of Applied Sciences
Metropolia University of Applied Sciences
Novia University of Applied Sciences
Savonia University of Applied Sciences
Seinäjoki University of Applied Sciences
Tampere University of Applied Sciences
Turku University of Applied Sciences
University of Turku

France
École Supérieure d'Informatique du CESI
IMT Atlantique (formerly Telecom Bretagne)

Germany
Ernst-Abbe-Hochschule Jena
Hochschule Wismar, University of Applied Sciences Technology, Business and Design
RWTH Aachen University

Honduras
Universidad Tecnológica Centroamericana UNITEC

Iceland
Reykjavík University

India
Vel Tech University

Ireland
Trinity College, Dublin
University of Limerick

Israel
Afeka Tel Aviv Academic College of Engineering
SCE Shamoon College of Engineering

Italy
Politecnico di Milano

Japan
Hokkaido Information University
Kanazawa Institute of Technology
Kanazawa Technical College
National Institute of Technology, Kisarazu College
National Institute of Technology, Anan College

Malaysia
Ungku Omar Polytechnic
Ibrahim Sultan Polytechnic
Taylor's University
Universiti Teknologi MARA

Mongolia
Mongolian University of Science and Technology

Netherlands
Hague University of Applied Science
Faculty of Aerospace Engineering, Delft University of Technology
University of Twente

New Zealand
University of Auckland

Norway
Norwegian University of Science and Technology
Østfold University College

Philippines
Bulacan State University
University of Science and Technology of Southern Philippines
Batangas State University

Poland
Gdańsk University of Technology

Portugal
Instituto Superior de Engenharia do Porto

Russia
Astrakhan State University
Bauman Moscow State Technical University
Cherepovets State University
Don State Technical University
Kazan Federal University
Moscow Aviation Institute
Moscow Institute of Physics and Technology
National Research Nuclear University MEPhI 
North-Eastern Federal University
Orel State University
Saint Petersburg State University of Aerospace Instrumentation
Siberian Federal University
Skolkovo Institute of Science and Technology
Tomsk Polytechnic University
Tomsk State University of Control Systems and Radioelectronics
Ural Federal University

Singapore
Nanyang Polytechnic
Singapore Polytechnic

South Africa
University of Johannesburg
University of Pretoria

South Korea
Inje University

Spain
Universitat Politecnica de Catalunya
Technical University of Madrid

Sweden
Blekinge Institute of Technology
Chalmers University of Technology
Jönköping School of Engineering
Kristianstad University
Linköping University
Linnaeus University
Luleå University of Technology
Royal Institute of Technology
Umeå Institute of Technology
University of Skövde
University West

Taiwan
Feng Chia University

Thailand
Chulalongkorn University (Faculty of Engineering)
Rajamangala University of Technology Thanyaburi

Tunisia
École supérieure privée d'ingénierie et de technologie

United Kingdom
England
Aston University
Lancaster University
Nottingham Trent University
University of Bristol
University of Chichester
University of Leeds
University of Leicester
University of Liverpool
Scotland
University of Strathclyde
Northern Ireland
Queen's University Belfast
South Eastern Regional College
Ulster University

United States of America
Arizona State University
California State University, Northridge
Duke University
Embry-Riddle Aeronautical University
Massachusetts Institute of Technology
Naval Postgraduate School
Pennsylvania State University
Stanford University
U.S. Naval Academy
University of Arkansas
University of Colorado
University of Michigan
University of Notre Dame-College of Engineering

Vietnam
Dalat University
Duy Tan University
Vietnam National University, Ho Chi Minh City
Vinh University

Literature
CDIO currently has two guide books: Rethinking Engineering Education and Think Like an Engineer.

Sources

See also
Technology enhanced active learning

References

External links
Official site

Philosophy of education
International college and university associations and consortia